
Gmina Dąbrowa Tarnowska is an urban-rural gmina (administrative district) in Dąbrowa County, Lesser Poland Voivodeship, in southern Poland.

Villages
Apart from the town of Dąbrowa Tarnowska, Gmina Dąbrowa Tarnowska contains the villages and settlements of Brnik, Gruszów Mały, Gruszów Wielki, Laskówka Chorąska, Lipiny, Lipiny, Morzychna, Nieczajna Dolna, Nieczajna Górna, Smęgorzów, Sutków, Szarwark and Żelazówka.

Neighbouring gminas
Gmina Dąbrowa Tarnowska is bordered by the gminas of Lisia Góra, Mędrzechów, Olesno, Radgoszcz, Szczucin and Żabno.

References
Polish official population figures 2006

Dabrowa Tarnowska
Dąbrowa County